The Libertarian Party of Manitoba fielded six candidates in the 1988 provincial election, none of whom were elected.

Candidates
Elmwood: Russ Letkeman
Fort Rouge: Dennis Owens
Osborne: Clancy Smith
River Heights: Jim Weidman
St. James: Dennis Rice
St. Vital: Trevor Wiebe

1988